Rehearsal Club may refer to:
Rehearsal Club (London), a London organization founded in 1892 to support actresses during the day in London
Rehearsal Club (New York), a New York women's residence, founded in 1913 as a safe haven for aspiring young women pursuing a career in the arts